Þórður "Thordur" Gudjonsson (born 14 October 1973) is an Icelandic former professional footballer who played as a midfielder or striker.

Club career
Þórður was born in Akranes started his career with local teams KA Akureyri and ÍA Akranes, and moved to German team VfL Bochum in 1993. He spent four years at Bochum before moving to Belgium side Genk in 1997. He stayed at Genk for three seasons until in 2000 he moved to Spanish side Las Palmas, but saw limited playing action and was loaned out to English Premier League club Derby County in March 2001. At Derby he played ten league matches for the club in 2000–01 and scored once in the league against West Ham United. In 2001–02, he played eight matches for Preston North End before making a return to Bochum in 2002. He remained at Bochum until January 2005 when he joined Stoke City. His brother Bjarni and father Gudjon had both played and managed Stoke City respectively. He managed just two substitute appearances towards the end of the 2004–05 season and after playing just once in the League Cup in 2005–06 he returned to Iceland with ÍA Akranes.

International career
Þórður made his debut for Iceland in a September 1993 World Cup qualifier against Luxembourg. He went on to earn 58 caps, scoring 13 goals for the national team.

Personal life
Þórður's father Gudjon and brothers, Bjarni, Joey and their half brother Bjorn Sigurdarson have all been involved with professional football.

He retired in 2008 to take up politics.

Career statistics

Club

International

Honours
Genk
Belgian First Division: 1998–99
Belgian Cup: 1997–98, 1999–2000

References

External links
 
 
 

1973 births
Living people
Thordur Gudjonsson
Association football forwards
Association football midfielders
Thordur Gudjonsson
Thordur Gudjonsson
Thordur Gudjonsson
Thordur Gudjonsson
Thordur Gudjonsson
VfL Bochum players
K.R.C. Genk players
UD Las Palmas players
Derby County F.C. players
Preston North End F.C. players
Stoke City F.C. players
La Liga players
Premier League players
English Football League players
Bundesliga players
2. Bundesliga players
Belgian Pro League players
Thordur Gudjonsson
Thordur Gudjonsson
Expatriate footballers in Germany
Thordur Gudjonsson
Expatriate footballers in Belgium
Thordur Gudjonsson
Expatriate footballers in Spain
Thordur Gudjonsson
Expatriate footballers in England